Kabir Mulchandani is an Indian-born, Dubai-based real estate and hospitality businessman and philanthropist. He is the founder and Chairman of FIVE Global Holdings, which includes FIVE Hotels and Resorts; FIVE Palm Jumeirah, FIVE Jumeirah Village, FIVE Zurich and FIVE LUXE, JBR. He is ranked as one of the Richest and Most Powerful Indians in the Persian Gulf region.

Early life and education
For the 1992-93 school year, he pursued his undergraduate studies at Stanford University, in the United States, where he majored in industrial engineering, and earlier graduated from Phillips Exeter Academy. Prior to that he attended the elite Cathedral and John Connon School in Mumbai.

Career

Baron Electronics 
Mulchandani served at Baron International and Baron Electronics, two Mumbai-based, family-owned firms that specialised in the distribution and sale of consumer electronics.

SKAI Real Estate 
In 2011, he founded SKAI Holdings, a Dubai-based real estate investment firm. In 2013, SKAI revealed plans for a luxurious hotel on Dubai's manmade Palm Jumeirah, and signed up Viceroy, the Los Angeles based hotel management company to brand and manage the property. He was quickly celebrated as the come back king of Dubai in the local media, along with his business partner and architect Nabil Akiki and his long time friend Aloki Batra. Kabir's circle of trusted friends later expanded to include Indian educated consultant-cum-site supervisor-cum-hotelier Jaydeep Anand.

In the end of 2016, SKAI officially completed building the $1.17 billion Palm Jumeirah Dubai hotel with 477 rooms and 221 residences.

FIVE Hotels 
In 2017, Kabir changed his company's name from SKAI to FIVE, symbolized by the Roman numeral number Five; “V”.

The Viceroy Palm Jumeirah hotel opened on 31 March 2017, with much of its beach off limits for guest use due to the ongoing construction works by master plan developer Nakheel. In June 2017, FIVE terminated Viceroy as its hotel manager, and the Viceroy Palm Jumeirah was rebranded as FIVE Palm Jumeirah. Since then, the new operator has completed all the unfinished works including 476 Rooms and apartments, 221 Luxury Residences, the beach, spa, salon and 8 F&B outlets.

FIVE Music 
In 2021, FIVE Hotels and Resorts launched its own record label FIVE Music to produce a hand crafted portfolio of the worlds music.

Controversies
In 2009, Kabir was arrested in Dubai for a highly publicized case of real estate fraud. He was first let out on bail after 140 days, and later acquitted of all these charges in 2010.

It was found by the Supreme Court of Dubai, claimants accused Mr. Mulchandani in order to avoid honoring their financial obligations. The main allegation was directly dismissed by the Public Prosecutor. The second allegation was heard in Dubai Court and judge concluded that the accused did not deceive the plaintiffs in the civil action and was not satisfied with their statements in this regard and finds no credibility in the statements as they are baseless and without evidence supporting them. Mr. Mulchandani was exonerated and was acquitted from all allegations.

His legal battle with Viceroy over operator rights of the Palm Jumeriah hotel was highly publicized. Viceroy's termination took place on the same day Viceroy's UAE shareholders announced their plans to wholly own the company. Viceroy's web page has a clear note on it distancing itself from the property as it is run today.

Personal life
In 2012, he married his second wife Nadia Zaal, one of the most influential Emirati women in the GCC, the couple have three sons and one daughter.

Philanthropy
Mulchandani, who won Philanthropist of the Year at the CEO Middle East Awards 2017, supports a number of charities. In March 2017, his company FIVE launched Project Udaan with the aim of saving a life every day in India. The project provides daily life-saving surgery to children born with congenital heart defects, whose families could otherwise not afford the medical costs. It also supports the New Faces Charitable Trust, paying for surgery to help children born with facial deformities.

Sustainability 
Mulchandani presented at Reuters NEXT in New York City on November 30th, 2022. The presentation featured a ready-to-implement net zero energy building design as part of FIVE Global Holdings’ sustainable development strategy.

Awards

References

Businesspeople from Mumbai
Living people
1972 births